Wrzelowiec  is a village in the administrative district of Gmina Opole Lubelskie, within Opole Lubelskie County, Lublin Voivodeship, in eastern Poland. The village has a population of 413.

The village gives its name to the protected area called Wrzelowiec Landscape Park.

References

Wrzelowiec